Joyce Fielder is a female former international table tennis player from England.

Table tennis career
She won the 1953 National girls singles title aged 15. She was ranked number one in Kent.

She represented England at the 1957 World Table Tennis Championships in the Corbillon Cup (women's team event) with Ann Haydon, Jill Rook and Diane Rowe for England.

Personal life
During her childhood she lived with her family at the  New Eltham Sportsground where her father was a groundsman. Her great uncle was England cricket international Arthur Fielder.

See also
 List of England players at the World Team Table Tennis Championships

References

English female table tennis players
1938 births
Living people